Dame DeAnne Shirley Julius,  (born April 14, 1949) is a Distinguished Fellow at Chatham House. An American–British economist, Julius is noted as a founder member of the Monetary Policy Committee of the Bank of England.

She began her active career as a project economist with the World Bank in Washington and has handled extensive roles in the private sector. From 2003–12 she was Chairman of Chatham House in London and from 2014-19 was chair of the Council at University College London.

Early life and education
Julius was born the daughter of Marvin and Maxine Julius, and was raised in Ames, Iowa.

She earned a BSc degree in economics from Iowa State University, and an MA and PhD degree in economics from the University of California, Davis. She holds five honorary doctorates, from the University of Warwick, University of Birmingham, South Bank University, University of Bath, and Iowa State University.

Career
After graduating, Julius began her career at the CIA as an economic analyst from 1970-71. In 1975, after earning her Ph.D, she went on to work as a project economist with the World Bank in Washington, D.C.

From 1986-97, she held a succession of posts, including chief economist at British Airways and Royal Dutch Shell. From September 1997 to May 2001, she was a full-time member of the Monetary Policy Committee of the Bank of England, and sat on the Court of the Bank of England until May 2004. She chaired HM Treasury's banking services consumer codes review group in 2000–01 and the Public Services Industry Review in 2007-8 for the UK Department for Business, Enterprise and Regulation Reform.

She was a non-executive director on the boards of Lloyds Bank and Serco Group from 2001–07, BP from 2001-11, Roche Holdings SA from 2002–16, Jones Lang LaSalle from 2008–19, Deloitte LLP from 2011-14 and ICE Benchmark Administration from 2016-19. Julius was the Chairman of Chatham House, formally known as the Royal Institute of International Affairs, from 2003-12. From 2014-19 she was chair of the Council of University College London.

Board memberships and honours
Julius has served on a number of corporate boards, as listed above. She has also been a member of the International Advisory Boards of Temasek from 2010–17, the China Investment Corporation from 2016–20 and Rock Creek Global from 2004.

She was appointed Commander of the Order of the British Empire (CBE) in 2002 and Dame Commander of the Order of St Michael and St George (DCMG) in the 2013 New Year Honours for services to international relations.

Julius was appointed Usher of the Blue Rod of the Most Distinguished Order of Saint Michael and Saint George on February 11, 2016.

Personal life
Julius is married to Ian Alexander Harvey, formerly chief executive of BTG. She has written five books and academic papers on subjects ranging from foreign direct investment to strategic planning and corporate governance.

References

1949 births
English economists
BP people
Commanders of the Order of the British Empire
Dames Commander of the Order of St Michael and St George
American women economists
British women economists
Iowa State University alumni
University of California, Davis alumni
Living people
Naturalised citizens of the United Kingdom
American emigrants to England
Analysts of the Central Intelligence Agency
Place of birth missing (living people)
People from Ames, Iowa
Council and directors of Chatham House
Advisors to Chatham House
Economists from Iowa
21st-century American economists